Elvis Mutapčić (born July 19, 1986) is a Bosnian-American former mixed martial artist who competed in the Middleweight and the Light Heavyweight division of the Ultimate Fighting Championship (UFC).

Mixed martial arts career

Early career
Mutapčić compiled a professional mixed martial arts record of 13-2 winning various regional titles before signing for World Series of Fighting in April 2013.

World Series of Fighting
In April 2013, Mutapčić signed a multi-fight deal with World Series of Fighting.

Mutapčić was expected to make his WSOF debut against Jesse Taylor at WSOF 5. The New Jersey Athletic Commission cancelled the fight after seeing Mutapcic take an unknown and unapproved medication backstage before the fight. The fight was rescheduled for WSOF 7. He lost the fight via unanimous decision.

Mutapčić then faced Kelvin Tiller on August 9, 2014 at WSOF 12. He won the fight via unanimous decision.

Ultimate Fighting Championship
Mutapčić made his UFC debut at light heavyweight on January 17, 2016 as a late-notice opponent against Francimar Barroso at UFC Fight Night: Dillashaw vs. Cruz. He lost the fight via unanimous decision.

Mutapčić then moved to middleweight and faced Kevin Casey on June 4, 2016 at UFC 199. The fight ended in a split draw.

Mutapčić then faced Anthony Smith on December 3, 2016, at The Ultimate Fighter 24 Finale. He lost the fight via TKO in the second round. 

In February 2017, Mutapčić was released from the UFC.

Championships and accomplishments

Maximum Fighting Championship
MFC Middleweight Championship
One successful defence

Midwest Cage Championship
MCC Middleweight Championship

Mixed martial arts record

|-
|Win
|align=center|16–6–1
|Brian Imes
|TKO (punches)
|Midwest Cage Championship 65
|
|align=center|1
|align=center|4:34
|West Des Moines, Iowa, United States
|
|-
|Loss
|align=center|15–6–1
|Beslan Isaev
|KO (punches)
|ACB 61: Balaev vs. Bataev
|
|align=center|1
|align=center|0:33
|St. Petersburg, Russia
|
|-
|Loss
|align=center|15–5–1
|Anthony Smith
|TKO (elbow and punches)
|The Ultimate Fighter: Tournament of Champions Finale
|
|align=center|2
|align=center|3:27
|Las Vegas, Nevada, United States
|
|-
|Draw
|align=center|15–4–1
|Kevin Casey
|Draw (split)
|UFC 199
|
|align=center|3
|align=center|5:00
|Inglewood, California, United States
|
|-
|Loss
|align=center|15–4
|Francimar Barroso
|Decision (unanimous)
|UFC Fight Night: Dillashaw vs. Cruz
|
|align=center|3
|align=center|5:00
|Boston, Massachusetts, United States
|
|-
|Win
|align=center|15–3
|Sean Huffman
|Submission (punches)
|MCC 59: Howser vs. O’Brien
|
|align=center|1
|align=center|2:53
|Des Moines, Iowa, United States
|
|-
|Win
|align=center|14–3
|Kelvin Tiller
|Decision (unanimous)
|WSOF 12: Palomino vs. Gonzalez
|
|align=center|3
|align=center|5:00
|Las Vegas, Nevada, United States
|
|-
|Loss
|align=center|13–3
|Jesse Taylor
|Decision (unanimous)
|WSOF 7: Karakhanyan vs. Palmer
|
|align=center|3
|align=center|5:00
|Vancouver, British Columbia, Canada
|
|-
|Win
|align=center|13–2
|Sam Alvey
|Decision (unanimous)
|MFC 36: Reality Check
|
|align=center|5
|align=center|5:00
|Edmonton, Alberta, Canada
|
|-
|Win
|align=center|12–2
|Joseph Henle
|TKO (leg kick)
|MFC 35: Explosive Encounter
|
|align=center|3
|align=center|1:45
|Edmonton, Alberta, Canada
|
|-
|Win
|align=center|11–2
|Jacen Flynn
|TKO (punches)
|MFC 34: Total Recall
|
|align=center|1
|align=center|1:39
|Edmonton, Alberta, Canada
|
|-
|Win
|align=center|10–2
|Keenan Curry
|Submission (armbar)
|MCC 39: Domination
|
|align=center|2
|align=center|2:57
|Des Moines, Iowa, United States
|
|-
|Win
|align=center|9–2
|Cezar Ferreira
|KO (punch)
|Superior Cage Combat 2
|
|align=center|1
|align=center|0:25
|Las Vegas, Nevada, United States
|
|-
|Loss
|align=center|8–2
|Artenas Young
|Decision (unanimous)
|SF 16: Neer vs. Juarez
|
|align=center|3
|align=center|5:00
|Odessa, Texas, United States
|
|-
|Win
|align=center|8–1
|Josh Rosaaen
|Submission (guillotine choke)
|MCC 30: Thanksgiving Throwdown 3
|
|align=center|1
|align=center|4:50
||Des Moines, Iowa, United States
|
|-
|Win
|align=center|7–1
|Zak Cummings
|Decision (unanimous)
|MCC 27: Mutapcic vs. Cummings
|
|align=center|5
|align=center|5:00
|Des Moines, Iowa, United States
|
|-
|Win
|align=center|6–1
|Brett Stevens
|Submission (heel hook)
|MCC 25: Inferno
|
|align=center|1
|align=center|1:29
|Des Moines, Iowa, United States
|
|-
|Win
|align=center|5–1
|Mike Van Meer
|TKO (punches)
|MCC 23: Thanksgiving Throwdown 2
|
|align=center|2
|align=center|0:21
|Des Moines, Iowa, United States
|
|-
|Win
|align=center|4–1
|Carlos Newborn
|Submission (triangle choke)
|RCC 10: Devil’s Fight
|
|align=center|1
|align=center|0:43
|Iowa, United States
|
|-
|Loss
|align=center|3–1
|Andy Branson
|Decision (split)
|MCC 21: Mickle vs. Marriott 
|
|align=center|3
|align=center|5:00
|Des Moines, Iowa, United States
|
|-
|Win
|align=center|3–0
|Evan Marks
|TKO (punches)
|MCC 19: The Return
|
|align=center|1
|align=center|4:55
|Des Moines, Iowa, United States
|
|-
|Win
|align=center|2–0
|Thad England
|TKO (submission to punches)
|MCC 10: Vengeance
|
|align=center|1
|align=center|2:59
|Des Moines, Iowa, United States
|
|-
|Win
|align=center|1–0
|Mark Gearhart
|Submission (rear-naked choke)
|MCC 10: Vengeance
|
|align=center|1
|align=center|0:43
|Des Moines, Iowa, United States
|
|-

See also 
 List of male mixed martial artists

References

External links 
 
 

1986 births
Living people
Middleweight mixed martial artists
Sportspeople from Sarajevo
American male mixed martial artists
Ultimate Fighting Championship male fighters